The American Federation of Government Employees (AFGE) is an American labor union representing over 670,000 employees of the federal government, about 5,000 employees of the District of Columbia, and a few hundred private sector employees, mostly in and around federal facilities. AFGE is the largest union for civilian, non-postal federal employees and the largest union for District of Columbia employees who report directly to the mayor (i.e., outside D.C. public schools). It is affiliated with the AFL–CIO.

History

AFGE was founded on October 17, 1932, by local unions loyal to the American Federation of Labor (AFL) and left the National Federation of Federal Employees (NFFE) when that union became independent of the AFL (NFFE in 1998 became part of the IAMAW, which is affiliated with the AFL–CIO).

AFGE is a federation of local unions, with each local maintaining autonomy through operating under local constitutions that comply with the AFGE National constitution ratified originally during its founding in 1932.

Federal employees' right to organize and bargain binding labor contracts was established in law by the Civil Service Reform Act of 1978, which AFGE helped to draft, and which states that collective bargaining in the federal sector is in the public interest while also barring the right to strike.

AFGE has played a crucial role in the struggle for women's rights and civil rights in the federal sector, and was one of the first unions to establish a Women's Department and a Fair Practices Department, with the officer over those departments holding a seat on the National Executive Committee (NEC) and with Women's and Fair Practices Coordinators elected in each AFGE district since the early 1970s.

AFGE's December 2009 court suits stopped aspects of the George W. Bush Administration's "National Security Personnel System" (for DOD) and MAXHR (for DHS), and AFGE also won changes to law that make the contracting out process more balanced in regard to federal employees' interests. In 2010, the Obama Administration issued an Executive Order for the Federal Government to focus on insourcing Federal jobs rather than outsourcing them overseas or to contractors.

AFGE's motto was established as "To Do For All That Which No One Can Do For Oneself".

AFGE's original emblem was a shield with the stars and stripes and the words "Justice, Fraternity, Progress" and the current emblem is three workers supporting a globe with a map of the United States and the words "Proud to Make America Work".

In June 2011, AFGE also won the historic largest single nationwide consolidated bargaining unit election of over 44,000 employees of the Transportation Security Administration, part of the Department of Homeland Security. AFGE is working for a change in law which will give them the same collective bargaining rights as other federal employees.

In August 2015, AFGE at its national convention decided its official colors are blue and gold. All future insignia will meet as such.

Organization
AFGE is led by a National Executive Council, made up of National President Everett Kelley, a National Secretary-Treasurer, and National Vice President, Women's and Fair Practices, elected at a triennial National Convention, and 12 National Vice Presidents who oversee geographic districts and are elected at District caucuses.

Presidents 
1932: David Glass
John Arthur Shaw
1933: Claude Babcock
1936: Charles Irwin Stengle
Cecil E. Custer
1939: James B. Burns
1948: James G. Yaden
1950: Henry C. Iler
1951: James A. Campbell
1962: John Griner
1972: Clyde M. Webber
1976: Ken Blaylock
1988: John Sturdivant
1997: Bobby Harnage
2003: John Gage
2012: Jeffrey David Cox
2020: Everett Kelley

National Secretary-Treasurer Berniece Heffner served as Acting National President three times during transition periods due to retirement or death during her twenty years in office.

Other 
Labor relations in the federal sector are governed by the Federal Labor Relations Authority, an independent federal agency, and federal sector unions have recourse to binding arbitration and to the Federal Services Impasses Panel to resolve impasses which might lead to a strike in the private sector.

Numbered "Councils of Locals"

For AFGE, collective bargaining responsibilities are delegated to numbered "Councils of Locals" at major agencies, including the following:

 AFGE DEFCON
 AFGE Federal Fire Fighter Steering Committee
 AFGE Federal Law Enforcement Council
 Federal Protective Service Council
 The Food Safety Inspection Service (USDA) Council.
 National Border Patrol Council

 National Council of Prisons Locals (C-33)
 National Joint Council of Food Inspection Locals (C-45)
 Veteran's Administration Council.  a.k.a. National Council of VA Locals (C-53) The VA Council is the largest and currently accounts for over one third of the federation's membership. Alma L. Lee is the current president of the VA council.
 AFGE Council 73
 Transportation Security Administration a.k.a. AFGE TSA Council 100
 ICE Council. a.k.a. AFGE Council 118 (ICE)
 CIS Council (119)
 Coast Guard Council. (120)
 AFGE Council 162
 Defense Contract Management Agency (C-170)
 DFAS Council of DFAS Locals (C-171)
 AFGE Council 172
 AFGE Council 200
 Midwest Council of Food Inspection Locals (C-202)
 the Air Force Materiel Command a.k.a. Air Force Materiel Command Locals (C-214)
 National Council of EEOC Locals 216
 National Council of SSA Field Operations Locals (C-220)
 National Council of SSA Field Operations Locals (Atlanta Region) (C-220)
 HUD Council. a.k.a. National Council of HUD Locals (C-222)
 AFGE Council 224
 AFGE Council 235
 EPA Locals (C-238)
 AFGE Council 252
 Council of National Archives and Records Administration (NARA) Locals (C-260)
 Smithsonian Institution, Local 2463.

Membership
All union membership in the federal sector is entirely voluntary, as the law does not allow for the "closed shop"; federal employees are barred from being candidates for partisan political office, and no dues money may be spent on partisan political campaigns.

AFGE has been growing in membership in recent years and now has more than 300,000 dues paying members in about 1,200 AFGE Locals at more than 100 federal agencies.  AFGE represents almost every type of worker in the American economy, blue collar and white collar, and covers a variety of professional, technical and support personnel—including nurses, doctors, machinists, electricians, aircraft mechanics, astronauts, scientists, safety inspectors, mine inspectors, food inspectors, environmental specialists, accountants and accounting technicians, fire fighters, police officers, correctional officers, cowboys, engineers, administrative assistants, janitors, radio and TV broadcasters, procurement specialists, quality assurance specialists, benefits administrators, housekeepers, lawyers and paralegals, boiler plant operators and many more.

Over 1,000 members show up to the union’s triennial convention in Nevada, which lasts about half a week. The grand finale is everyone singing "Solidarity Forever".

See also

 Barbara Hutchinson, former director of women's department
 United Public Workers of America
 National Federation of Federal Employees

References

External links
 American Federation of Government Employees
 AFGE National VA Council

AFL–CIO
Civil service trade unions
Trade unions established in 1932
Trade unions in the United States